Guru Shishyaru may refer to:
 Guru Shishyaru (1981 film), an Indian Kannada-language comedy film
 Guru Shishyaru (2022 film), an Indian Kannada-language sports drama film